Blazing Stewardesses is a 1975 American sex comedy film directed by Al Adamson. Its title derives from the 1975 film The Naughty Stewardesses and the 1974 film Blazing Saddles.

Producer Sam Sherman intended the film to be a fond throwback to B-pictures of the 1940s, and hired a cast of screen veterans: the Ritz Brothers, Yvonne De Carlo, Don "Red" Barry, and Bob Livingston. Originally, the film was to have starred the then-current incarnation of The Three Stooges, but last surviving original Stooge Moe Howard was too ill to perform, which led to the Ritz Brothers being brought in as replacements for the March 1975 filming; Moe Howard died in early May 1975. There is some "T&A" content (DeCarlo's character runs a brothel) but nothing explicit, and the film mostly resembles a vintage western, complete with dude ranch setting, outlaw hijackers, stunt riders, masked cowboy hero, and rodeo footage (intercut with shots of Harry and Jimmy Ritz kibbitzing in the stands).

Because of the western theme, the working title The Jet Set  was changed to Blazing Stewardesses to capitalize on the box-office hit Blazing Saddles. The film was later re-released under at least three alternate titles: Texas Layover, Cathouse Cowgirls, and The Great Truck Robbery.

Plot

Cast
 Yvonne De Carlo – Honey Morgan
 Bob Livingston – Ben Brewster
 Don "Red" Barry – Mike Trask
 Harry Ritz – Harry
 Jimmy Ritz – Jimmy
 Geoffrey Land – Bob "Bobby" Travers
 Connie Hoffman – Debbie Stewart
 Regina Carrol – Lori Winters
 T. A. King – Barbara Watson
 Lon Bradshaw – Old Timer
 Jerry Mills – Pilot
 Nicolle Riddell – Jackie
 Sheldon Lee – Chuck
 Carol Bilger – Chuck's Girl
 Jon Shank – Sheik
 Leonard Geer – Plane Passenger
 Jack Tyree – Plane Passenger
 James Winburn – Plane Passenger
 Barney Gelfman – Plane Passenger
 Samuel M. Sherman – Gunfighter in Blue Shirt

See also
 List of American films of 1975

External links
 

1975 films
American sex comedy films
1970s English-language films
1970s sex comedy films
Films directed by Al Adamson
1975 comedy films
1970s American films